Sekolah Menengah Kebangsaan Seri Serdang (commonly known as SMK Seri Serdang), is a secondary school in Taman Seri Serdang, Seri Kembangan, Selangor, Malaysia.

History 
The name origin of SMK Seri Serdang is of a tree called "Serdang". SMK Seri Serdang was built on a flat area and adjacent to a former tin mine which is now used as a recreational park. The school is within the walking distance of residential areas. SMK Seri Serdang was officially launched on 2 January 1983 by Datuk Amar Dr. Sulaiman Bin Haji Daud, then-Minister of Education of Malaysia.

The school had only two blocks (buildings) called "Block A" and "Block B", a cafeteria, and an art workshop. "Block D" building constructed in 1987. The following year, "Block C" which was a 3-storey buildings, was constructed. The building can accommodate 14 classrooms and 3 science laboratories. The population increase resulted in a shortage of classrooms. In 1992, a wooden building (Block E) was constructed immediately to address the shortage of classrooms. Block F was built by the building developers of Seri Serdang. It made by the school as the school administrative office building.

The school is able to accommodate 80 classrooms, 10 science laboratories, a library, an AV room, the headmaster office, supervisors office, sports room, prayer room.

Headmasters

References 

Petaling District
Schools in Selangor